Jeff Stuebing (born 27 March 1959) is a Canadian former wrestler, born in Hamilton, Ontario, who competed in the 1984 Summer Olympics. In the 1983 Pan American Games 74.0 kg. Greco-Roman category he won the gold medal.

References

External links
 

1959 births
Living people
Sportspeople from Hamilton, Ontario
Olympic wrestlers of Canada
Wrestlers at the 1984 Summer Olympics
Canadian male sport wrestlers
Pan American Games gold medalists for Canada
Pan American Games medalists in wrestling
Wrestlers at the 1983 Pan American Games
Medalists at the 1983 Pan American Games
20th-century Canadian people